The following radio stations broadcast on 91.2 MHz.

France
Radio Le Mans (English language radio coverage of the Le Mans 24 Hours)

Japan
Nankai Broadcasting in Kawanoe, Ehime
Nankai Broadcasting in Yawatahama, Ehime

Turkey
TRT-2 at Hatay

References

Lists of radio stations by frequency